John Caddell may refer to:

 John B. Caddell, an American tanker ship
 John Caddell, 7th Thane of Caddell, whose descendants through his daughter Muriel became Clan Campbell of Cawdor
 John Caddell (baseball), Wake Forest Demon Deacons baseball coach (1926–1939)